Luke Vincent Ferreira (born April 2, 1995) is an American soccer player who currently plays for Chattanooga FC.

Career

Youth
Ferreira spent time with Fluminense in Brazil, and Sertanense and A.D. Estação in Portugal.

College & Amateur
Ferreira returned to the United States to play college soccer at Eastern Florida State College in 2015, before transferring to Stetson University for the 2016 season, where he made 16 appearances, scoring 4 goals and tallying 4 assists.

In 2017, following college, Ferriera appeared for both USL PDL side Palm Beach Suns and NPSL side Boca Raton FC, but didn't make a first team league appearance for the club.

Professional
Ferreira joined Norwegian 1. divisjon club FK Jerv, where he played for two seasons.

On December 18, 2019, Ferreira joined USL Championship side Colorado Springs Switchbacks ahead of their 2020 season. He made his professional debut ion July 18, 2020, appearing as an 82nd-minute substitute in a 3–3 draw with Real Monarchs.

On March 1, 2022, Ferreira signed with National Independent Soccer Association side Chattanooga FC.

Personal
Ferreira also holds citizenship with Portugal and Brazil through his parents.

Ferreira was born in New Jersey, but grew up in Deerfield Beach, Florida.

References

External links

1995 births
Norwegian First Division players
American expatriate soccer players
American expatriate sportspeople in Norway
American soccer players
Association football forwards
Boca Raton FC players
Chattanooga FC players
Colorado Springs Switchbacks FC players
EFSC Titans men's soccer players
Expatriate footballers in Norway
FK Jerv players
Living people
National Premier Soccer League players
Soccer players from Florida
Stetson Hatters men's soccer players
USL Championship players
USL League Two players